Barter Bluff  is a prominent rock bluff  west of Leister Peak in the Kohler Range, Marie Byrd Land. The bluff forms part of the steep wall along the east side of Kohler Glacier. It was mapped by the United States Geological Survey from surveys and from U.S. Navy air photos, 1959–66, and named by the Advisory Committee on Antarctic Names for Leland L. Barter, Ship's Engineer on the Eleanor Bolling during the Byrd Antarctic Expedition, 1928–30, and on both the Bear of Oakland and the Jacob Ruppert during the Byrd Antarctic Expedition, 1933–35.

References 

Cliffs of Marie Byrd Land